Alphonse Antoine (19 August 1915 in Corny-sur-Moselle – 21 November 1999 in Metz) was a French professional road bicycle racer.

Major results

1935
 national track sprint amateur championship
1936
Mulhouse
1937
Tour de France:
Winner stage 12A
1938
GP de Lorraine
1939
GP de Metz
Tour de Doubs

References

External links 

Official Tour de France results for Alphonse Antoine

1915 births
1999 deaths
Sportspeople from Moselle (department)
People from Alsace-Lorraine
French male cyclists
French Tour de France stage winners
Cyclists from Grand Est